Malcolm Moses Adams Brogdon (born December 11, 1992) is an American professional basketball player for the Boston Celtics of the National Basketball Association (NBA). He played college basketball for the Virginia Cavaliers under Tony Bennett. As a senior in 2015–16, he was a consensus first-team All-American. He was also named the Atlantic Coast Conference (ACC) Player of the Year and Defensive Player of the Year, becoming the first player in conference history to earn both honors in the same season. He was selected in the second round of the 2016 NBA draft by the Bucks with the 36th overall pick. He went on to win the NBA Rookie of the Year Award, becoming the first second-round pick in the NBA to win the award since 1965.
In 2019, Brogdon became the eighth player in NBA history to achieve a 50–40–90 season.

College career

Brogdon, a top 100 recruit, committed to Virginia over offers from Arkansas, Georgia, and Notre Dame.

He redshirted his sophomore year after suffering a serious foot injury the prior season. He was known as one of the top contributors to the team's successful 2013–14 and 2014–15 seasons. In the 2013–14 season, Brogdon averaged 12.7 points, 5.4 rebounds, and 2.7 assists per game. In 2014–15, he was named as a consensus second-team All-American, as well as the first-team All-ACC and ACC Co-Defensive Player of the Year.

As a senior at Virginia in 2015–16, Brogdon was named to the 35-man midseason watchlist for the Naismith Trophy, and earned numerous prestigious awards, including ACC Player of the Year, ACC Defensive Player of the Year, first-team All-American, and a finalist for the Naismith Award. Brogdon graduated from Virginia with a bachelor's degree in history and a master's degree in public policy. His college jersey number, 15, was retired on February 20, 2017.

Professional career

Milwaukee Bucks (2016–2019)

2016–17 season: Rookie of the Year
On June 23, 2016, Brogdon was selected by the Milwaukee Bucks with the 36th overall pick in the 2016 NBA draft. On July 30, 2016, he signed with the Bucks. He made his NBA debut in the Bucks' season opener on October 26, 2016, recording eight points and five assists in 21 minutes in a 107–96 loss to the Charlotte Hornets. On November 1, 2016, he recorded 14 points and four steals in a 117–113 win over the New Orleans Pelicans. On December 23, 2016, he made all seven of his shots for 17 points to go with seven assists in 29 minutes in a 123–96 win over the Washington Wizards. On December 31, 2016, he recorded his first career triple-double with 15 points, 12 assists and 11 rebounds in a 116–96 win over the Chicago Bulls. On January 8, 2017, he scored a career-high 22 points in a 107–101 loss to the Washington Wizards. On January 23, 2017, he had his second game of the season with four steals in a 127–114 win over the Houston Rockets. Two days later, he was named in the U.S. Team for the 2017 Rising Stars Challenge. On March 29, 2017, he recorded 16 points and nine assists in a 103–100 win over the Boston Celtics. He had six key points and two assists in the final 2:46 to help Milwaukee fend off a late Boston rally. To conclude his rookie season, Brogdon was named the 2016–17 NBA Rookie of the Year, along with being a unanimous selection to the NBA All-Rookie First Team. Brogdon joined Lew Alcindor (1969–70) as the only players in Bucks history to win Rookie of the Year, and became the first player drafted in the second round to win Rookie of the Year since 1965. Brogdon averaged both the fewest points per game and fewest minutes per game of any winner in the award's history.

2017–18 season: Sophomore season
In the Bucks' season opener on October 18, 2017, Brogdon scored 19 points in a 108–100 win over the Boston Celtics. On November 3, 2017, he had a season-high 10 assists to go with 21 points against the Detroit Pistons. Four days later, he scored a season-high 22 points against the Cleveland Cavaliers. On January 22, 2018, he scored a career-high 32 points in a 109–105 win over the Phoenix Suns. It was the first 30-point game for a Virginia basketball alum since Mike Scott in 2014 with the Atlanta Hawks. On February 2, 2018, he was ruled out for six to eight weeks after suffering a partially torn left quadriceps tendon the previous night against the Minnesota Timberwolves. On April 9, 2018, he returned to action following a 30-game absence. He scored two points and played 13 minutes, all in the first half, in the Bucks' 102–86 win over the Orlando Magic.

2018–19 season: 50–40–90 season 
On November 28, 2018, Brogdon scored 24 points in 29 minutes on 6-for-6 three-point field goal shooting in a 116–113 win against the Chicago Bulls. On February 27, 2019, Brogdon scored 25 points, including 9-for-11 from the field, in a 141–140 overtime win over the Sacramento Kings. Brogdon enjoyed the best shooting year of his career, and one of the most efficient in NBA history: he became just the eighth NBA player ever to achieve a 50–40–90 season. However, on March 16, he was ruled out indefinitely with a plantar fascia tear in his right foot. He returned to action late in the second round of the playoffs.

Indiana Pacers (2019–2022)
On June 29, 2019, the Bucks extended a qualifying offer to Brogdon in order to make him a restricted free agent. On July 6, 2019, Brogdon signed with the Indiana Pacers via a sign-and-trade with the Milwaukee Bucks in exchange for future picks. Brogdon signed a contract with the Pacers for $85.0 million over four years (average of $21.25 million per year).

New to starting at the point guard position, Brogdon studied tape of former NBA All-Star Isiah Thomas in the off-season. Brogdon had a double-double in each of his first four games in a Pacers uniform. After his first week with the Pacers, he led the NBA in assists and become the first NBA player in history to tally at least 20 points and 10 assists in both of his first two games with a new team. On October 26, 2019, Brogdon had 30 points (on 12-for-18 shooting) and 10 assists in a 110–99 loss to the Cleveland Cavaliers. On June 24, 2020, Brogdon announced that he tested positive for the COVID-19 virus.

On January 2, 2021, Brogdon scored 33 points with 7 assists in a 106–102 loss to the New York Knicks. On January 4, Brogdon put up 21 points, 11 assists, seven rebounds, three steals, and one block, alongside a game-winning layup, in a 118–116 overtime win over the New Orleans Pelicans. On January 6, Brogdon scored a career-high 35 points, along with seven assists in a 114–107 win over the Houston Rockets. On January 25, Brogdon improved his career-high to 36 points in the Pacers' 129–114 win against the Toronto Raptors.

In his third season with the Pacers, Brogdon was asked to be more of a leader on and off the court. Brogdon missed 41 games from December through April with Achilles pain. Even with the significant time he missed, he led the team in scoring for the second straight year, while being second in assists per game.

Boston Celtics (2022–present)
On July 9, 2022, Brogdon was traded to the Boston Celtics in exchange for Aaron Nesmith, Daniel Theis, Nik Stauskas, Malik Fitts, Juwan Morgan, and a 2023 first round draft pick. Brogdon had been given the choice to be traded to the Celtics or the Toronto Raptors. On October 18, Brogdon had 16 points off the bench in his debut for his new team in a 126–117 win over the Philadelphia 76ers. On January 14, Brogdon scored a season-high 30 points on 11-of-17 shooting from the field and 4-of-6 from 3-point range against the Charlotte Hornets.

National team career
Brogdon represented the United States national team at the 2015 Pan American Games, where he won a bronze medal.

Career statistics

NBA

Regular season

|-
| style="text-align:left;"|
| style="text-align;left;"|Milwaukee
| 75 || 28 || 26.4 || .457 || .404 || .865 || 2.8 || 4.2 || 1.1 || .2 || 10.2
|-
| style="text-align:left;"|
| style="text-align;left;"|Milwaukee
| 48 || 20 || 29.9 || .485 || .385 || .882 || 3.3 || 3.2 || .9 || .3 || 13.0
|-
| style="text-align:left;"|
| style="text-align;left;"|Milwaukee
| 64 || 64 || 28.6 || .505 || .426 || style="background:#cfecec;"|.928* || 4.5 || 3.2 || .7 || .2 || 15.6
|-
| style="text-align:left;"|
| style="text-align:left;"| Indiana
| 54 || 54 || 30.9 || .438 || .326 || .892 || 4.9 || 7.1 || .6 || .2 || 16.5
|-
| style="text-align:left;"|
| style="text-align:left;"| Indiana
| 56 || 56 || 34.5 || .453 || .388 || .864 || 5.3 || 5.9 || .9 || .3 || 21.2
|-
| style="text-align:left;"|
| style="text-align:left;"| Indiana
| 36 || 36 || 33.5 || .448 || .312 || .856 || 5.1 || 5.9 || .8 || .4 || 19.1
|- class="sortbottom"
| style="text-align:center;" colspan="2"|Career
| 333 || 258 || 30.2 || .464 || .376 || .881 || 4.2 || 4.8 || .9 || .2 || 15.5

Playoffs

|-
| style="text-align:left;"|2017
| style="text-align:left;"|Milwaukee
| 6 || 6 || 30.5 || .400 || .476 ||  || 4.3 || 3.5 || .5 || .3 || 9.0
|-
| style="text-align:left;"|2018
| style="text-align:left;"|Milwaukee
| 7 || 5 || 26.6 || .436 || .263 || .800 || 3.4 || 2.4 || .1 || .0 || 8.7
|-
| style="text-align:left;"|2019
| style="text-align:left;"|Milwaukee
| 7 || 2 || 28.3 || .449 || .378 || .636 || 4.9 || 3.4 || .7 || .1 || 13.0
|-
| style="text-align:left;"|2020
| style="text-align:left;"|Indiana
| 4 || 4 || 40.0 || .400 || .375 || .893 || 4.3 || 10.0 || 1.0 || .0 || 21.5
|- class="sortbottom"
| style="text-align:center;" colspan="2"|Career
| 24 || 17 || 30.3 || .423 || .376 || .816 || 4.2 || 4.3 || .5 || .1 || 12.2

College

|-
| style="text-align:left;"|2011–12
| style="text-align:left;"|Virginia
| 28 || 1 || 22.4 || .396 || .324 || .800 || 2.8 || 1.4 || .5 || .1 || 6.7
|-
| style="text-align:left;"|2013–14
| style="text-align:left;"|Virginia
| 37 || 37 || 31.4 || .413 || .370 || .875 || 5.4 || 2.7 || 1.2 || .1 || 12.7
|-
| style="text-align:left;"|2014–15
| style="text-align:left;"|Virginia
| 34 || 34 || 32.5 || .412 || .344 || .879 || 3.9 || 2.4 || .7 || .4 || 14.0
|-
| style="text-align:left;"|2015–16
| style="text-align:left;"|Virginia
| 37 || 37 || 33.9 || .474 || .411 || .878 || 4.2 || 2.8 || .9 || .2 || 18.2
|- class="sortbottom"
| style="text-align:center;" colspan="2"|Career
| 136 || 109 || 30.6 || .430 || .365 || .876 || 4.1 || 2.5 || .9 || .2 || 13.3

Personal life
Brogdon's father, Mitchell Gino Brogdon, Sr., is a lawyer and mediator best known as the host of the syndicated court show Personal Injury Court. Dr. Jann Adams, Brogdon's mother, is the former chair of Morehouse College's Psychology Department. She is now the associate dean of science and math. His mother and father divorced when he was 11. Brogdon's oldest brother Gino is a practicing attorney, while his other older brother John is in law school.

Brogdon is a distant cousin of actress and singer Queen Latifah.

He is nicknamed "The President", due to his professional demeanor and Masters Degree in Public Policy from the Batten School of Leadership and Public Policy at the University of Virginia.

Community involvement
In 2018, Brogdon founded Hoops2O, a nonprofit aimed at addressing the clean-water crisis, particularly in Africa. As of May 2019, $274,200 had been raised for the cause. Brogdon is a member of the "Starting Five", along with Joe Harris, Justin Anderson, Anthony Tolliver, and Garrett Temple, who initially made a goal to raise $225,000 through Hoops2O to fund five wells in East Africa by the end of the 2018–19 season. Brogdon traveled with Anderson and Harris to Tanzania to witness the opening of the first well they funded in July 2019, and by November Hoops2O had raised nearly $400,000. By February 2020, the charity had funded the construction of ten wells in Tanzania and Kenya, bringing water to over 52,000 citizens.

References

External links

 Virginia Cavaliers bio

1992 births
Living people
21st-century African-American sportspeople
African-American basketball players
All-American college men's basketball players
American men's basketball players
Basketball players at the 2015 Pan American Games
Basketball players from Atlanta
Boston Celtics players
Indiana Pacers players
Medalists at the 2015 Pan American Games
Milwaukee Bucks draft picks
Milwaukee Bucks players
Pan American Games bronze medalists for the United States
Pan American Games medalists in basketball
Shooting guards
United States men's national basketball team players
Virginia Cavaliers men's basketball players